Parapuã is a municipality in the state of São Paulo in Brazil. The population is 10,949 (2020 est.) in an area of 366 km². The elevation is 486 m. It was founded by Luiz de Souza Leão in 1934.

In the 1970s the county was called "Capital of the Coffee" because there were 12,500,000 coffee plants. But in 1975 a frost destroyed most of them. In spite of this, coffee is still important for the local economy, along with sugar cane and corn.

References

Populated places established in 1934
Municipalities in São Paulo (state)